Syringodea is a genus of flowering plants in the family Iridaceae, first described as a genus in 1873. The entire genus is endemic to South Africa.

The genus name is derived from the Greek word syrinx, meaning "pipe", and alludes to the long perianth tube.

 Species
 Syringodea bifucata M.P.de Vos - Eastern Cape, Free State, Gauteng
 Syringodea concolor (Baker) M.P.de Vos - Eastern Cape, Northern Cape, Western Cape
 Syringodea derustensis M.P.de Vos - Western Cape
 Syringodea flanaganii Baker - 	Eastern Cape
 Syringodea longituba (Klatt) Kuntze - Western Cape
 Syringodea pulchella Hook.f. - Eastern Cape
 Syringodea saxatilis M.P.de Vos - Western Cape
 Syringodea unifolia Goldblatt - Northern Cape, Western Cape

References

Iridaceae genera
Endemic flora of South Africa
Iridaceae